Mo Li Hua is a Chinese folk song from the Jiangnan region. The song dates back to the 18th century. Over time, many regional variations were created, and the song gained popularity both in China and abroad.

It has been used during events such as 2004 Summer Olympics, 2008 Summer Olympics and 2010 Shanghai Expo opening ceremony, and during the 2011 Chinese protests.

History and popularity

It was created during the Qianlong era (1735–1796) of the Qing dynasty. There are several regional versions of the song, with different lyrics and melody.
One version of the song describes a custom of giving jasmine flowers, popular in the southern Yangtze delta region of China. Another, longer version describes the fear of plucking the flower. It has been played on ancient metal bells (bianzhong) and modern jade chimes. It uses the five note (pentatonic) scale ubiquitous in Chinese music. The tune is one of xiaodiao ("short tunes"), popular in Chinese urban areas. In 1804 a British diplomat, John Barrow, noted that the tune seems to be one of the most popular songs in China.

The song became one of the first Chinese folk songs to become widely known outside China. In 1896 the song was used as temporary national anthem by the Qing Chinese officials in Europe. The melody has become well known among Western listeners as it was used by Giacomo Puccini in his opera Turandot (1926), boy choir air "Là, sui monti dell'est", where it is associated with 'Turandot's splendor'. It appeared in a 1937 Hollywood movie The Good Earth (based on a novel by Pearl S. Buck). It has been adapted by many artists around the world, for example by Kenny G. In 1982 the song found a place on a UNESCO list of recommended songs. When China regained sovereignty of Macau and Hong Kong, in 1999 and 1997, respectively, this music was played in the ceremonies. The song was said to be a favorite of China's former leader, Jiang Zemin (it was at his request that the song was played during the transfer ceremony in Hong Kong). The tune was played during Central Committee of the Communist Party of China meetings.

This song was sung partially unaccompanied by a young Chinese girl, and partially accompanied by the music by Peking University students (whose version has been described as infused with a techno beat) and broadcast to the world at the closing ceremonies of the 2004 Summer Olympics in Athens, Greece, to introduce the next Olympic Games site. An adaptation of the melody by Tan Dun and Wang Hesheng, chosen from more than 4,000 pieces, was played during the medal ceremonies at the Beijing 2008 Olympic Games. It was also performed at the 2010 Shanghai Expo opening ceremony by an orchestra with the pianist Lang Lang.

Zhao Dongming, head of Beijing Organizing Committee for the Olympic Games's culture and ceremonies department, commented that "This piece of music reminds you of the gold medals for the Beijing Olympics, which are made of gold and jade". This piece of Tan Dun, an Academy Award winning Chinese contemporary classical composer, cited by China Daily in 2008, described it as "glorious, heartwarming and full of respect... an iconic piece... almost a cultural symbol of China" and "From Puccini to the Beijing Olympics, this melody is a gift from the Chinese people to the world's athletes". In 2009 Russian singer Vitas, during the Chinese premiere of his program Sleepless Night, at least has also performed Mo Li Hua (never included in digital download until then).

During the 2011 Chinese pro-democracy protests the song became associated with the Jasmine Revolution, as organisers instructed protesters to play Mo Li Hua on their cell phones as a form of antigovernment protest. The song was placed on authorities' list of online censored materials. Videos of the song, including at least one from an official event (a 2006 Kenyan students welcome for Chinese president Hu Jintao), were removed from Chinese websites, and searches for the song's name were blocked. The censorship attracted widespread attention and was difficult because of the popularity of the song and its association with Chinese culture and history. At least one new version of the song, mentioning fear of arrests, has been developed by the activists as a response.

In 2013, international superstar Celine Dion performed the song in Mandarin on Chinese state TV as part of its New Year Gala show welcoming in the Lunar New Year. She sang in a duet with Chinese soprano Song Zuying.

Since 2018, Kazakh singer Dimash Kudaibergen (Qudaibergen) has performed this song in Mandarin on four occasions, three years in a row, during New Year and Chinese New Year celebration galas on various TV stations including a  duet with vocalist Luo Tianyi on 23rd January 2020.

Lyrics
There are several versions of the song, with different lyrics and melody.

First variant
One of the popular versions lyrics goes:

Traditional Chinese
好一朵美麗的茉莉花
好一朵美麗的茉莉花
芬芳美麗滿枝椏
又香又白人人誇
讓我來將你摘下
送給別人家
茉莉花呀茉莉花

Simplified Chinese
好一朵美丽的茉莉花
好一朵美丽的茉莉花
芬芳美丽满枝桠
又香又白人人夸
让我来将你摘下
送给别人家
茉莉花呀茉莉花

Pinyin 
Hǎo yī duǒ měilì de mòlihuā
Hǎo yī duǒ měilì de mòlihuā
Fēn fāng měilì mǎn zhī yā
Yòu xiāng yòu bái rén rén kuā
Ràng wǒ lái jiāng nǐ zhāi xià
Sòng gěi biérén jiā 
Mòlihuā ya mòlihuāIn some cases, biérén (别人) is replaced with qíngláng (情郎), meaning "male lover" (boyfriend)

 Literal translation fitting music 
What a pretty Jasmine flower,
What a pretty Jasmine flower,
Nice to see and nice to smell!
Praiseworthy scent, and white as well!
You are what I'd like to pluck
- Giving other people (luck).
Oh so pretty, Jasmine Flower!

 Poetic translation 
Flower of jasmine, so fair!
Flower of jasmine, so fair!
Budding and blooming here and there,
Pure and fragrant all do declare.
Let me pick you with tender care,
Sweetness for all to share.
Jasmine fair, oh Jasmine fair.

Literary translation

What a Jasmine Brimming with Beauty
What a jasmine brimming with beauty!
What a jasmine brimming with beauty!
Aromas round twigs dance glee.
It's sweet 'n white, all praise highly.
Please allow me to pick thee,
as a gift ne'er twee.
Jasmine thee, yeah, Jasmine thee.

 English version sing-along 
Hǎo yī duǒ měi lì de mò li huā
Hǎo yī duǒ měi lì de mò li huā
Fragrant flowers filled the air,
Beautiful blossoms everywhere
Choose a blossom white and pure
Give to the one that you adore
Mò li huā, yā, mò li huā.

Second variant
Another popular versions' lyrics, with three strophes:

Traditional Chinese
好一朵茉莉花,
滿園花開香也香不過她,
我有心采一朵戴
又怕看花的人兒罵.

好一朵茉莉花,
茉莉花開雪也白不過她,
我有心采一朵戴,
又怕旁人笑話.

好一朵茉莉花,
滿園花開比也比不過她,
我有心采一朵戴,
又怕來年不發芽.

Simplified Chinese
好一朵茉莉花,
好一朵茉莉花,
满园花开香也香不过它,
我有心采一朵戴
又怕看花的人儿要将我骂.

好一朵茉莉花,
好一朵茉莉花,
茉莉花开雪也白不过它,
我有心采一朵戴,
又怕旁人笑话.

好一朵茉莉花,
好一朵茉莉花,
满园花开比也比不过它,
我有心采一朵戴,
又怕来年不发芽.

Hanyu Pinyin
Hǎo yī duo mòlìhuā,
Mǎn yuán huā kāi xiāng yě xiāng bùguò tā,
Wǒ yǒuxīn cǎi yī duo dài
Yòu pà kàn huā de rén er mà.
Hǎo yī duo mòlìhuā,
Mòlìhuā kāi xuě yě bái bu guò tā,
Wǒ yǒuxīn cǎi yī duo dài,
Yòu pà pángrén xiàohuà.
Hǎo yī duo mòlìhuā,
Mǎn yuán huā kāi bǐ yě bǐ bùguò tā,
Wǒ yǒuxīn cǎi yī duo dài,
Yòu pà láinián bù fāyá.

Literal translation
What a jasmine flower!
Of all the fragrant flowers and grasses in the garden,
there is none as fragrant as it.
I want to pluck one and wear it,
but the gardener would scold me.

What a jasmine flower!
When jasmine blooms.
not even snow is whiter.
I want to pluck one and wear it
But I'm afraid those around me would mock me.

What a jasmine flower!
Of all the blooms in the garden,
none compares to it.
I want to pluck one and wear it
But I'm afraid it wouldn't bud next year.

See alsoJasminum sambac, the species of jasmine the song is based on.
Music of China

Notes
 The song has been mistakenly titled as 抹梨花, which is pronounced the same.

 Though most commonly known in English as the Jasmine Flower, the title has also been translated as Beautiful Jasmine Flower or Such a Beautiful Jasmine. It has also been transliterated as Mo Li Hua, Mo-Li Hua, Moli Hua and Molihua''.

References

Chinese folk songs
Censorship of music
Internet censorship in China
Censored works
18th-century songs
18th-century establishments in China